Dusk and Desire is the second studio album by electronic band Moev, released in 1986 by Nettwerk and Profile Records. It was Moev's first album to feature Kelly Cook on bass, and the last to feature both Mark Jowett on electric guitar and the band's co-founder Cal Stephenson on synthesizers.

Critical reception 

In a retrospective review for AllMusic, critic Michael Sutton wrote of the album, "although the album moves at a quick pace, it's still a chore to listen to." Adding that "there's no personality in these tracks; they're faceless. Book of Love springs to mind whenever Michella Arrichiello sings, and that's about as memorable as Dusk and Desire gets."

Track listing

Personnel 
Credits are adapted from the Dusk and Desire liner notes.

Moev

Michela Arrichiello – vocals
Cal Stephenson – keyboards; programming; vocals
Mark Jowett – acoustic guitar; electric guitar; EBow
Tom Ferris – keyboards; programming

Additional musicians
Lucky Aruliah – synthesizer bass
Kelly Cook – bass
Greg Reely – bass
Christine Jones – backing vocals

Artwork
Steven Wasney – photography
Steven R. Gilmore – design
Greg Sykes – design assistant

Technical
Moev – producer; engineer
Greg Reely – producer; engineer
John Forbes – producer
Rob Porter – producer
Terry McBride – executive producer; editing
Tom Ferris – editing
Dave Ogilvie – engineer
George Semkiw – engineer
Chris Sheppard – editing

References

External links 

1986 albums
Moev albums
Nettwerk Records albums